Guillermo Vilas defeated Wojtek Fibak 6-4, 6-3, 6-0 to win the  April 1977 ATP Buenos Aires singles competition. Vilas was the defending champion.

Seeds
A champion seed is indicated in bold text while text in italics indicates the round in which that seed was eliminated.

  Guillermo Vilas (Champion)
  Wojciech Fibak (Final)

Draw

Key
 NB: All rounds up to but not including the final were the best of 3 sets. The final was the best of 5 sets.

Final

Section 1

Section 2

External links
 1977 ATP Buenos Aires (April) draw

Singles